The African Writers' Evening is the first regular evening held for African writers at the UK's Poetry Café. It was started in 2003 by Nii Ayikwei Parkes in consultation with the directors of the Poetry Society after he completed a residency there. The solid reputation of African Writers' Evening is based on its ability to consistently identify and feature talented emerging writers.

Diana Evans and Hisham Matar, for example, were both featured prior to the official releases of their début publications, two of 2007's features Ken Kamoche and Sade Adeniran were shortlisted for the 2008 Commonwealth Prize for their first books, and Inua Ellams won an Edinburgh Festival Fringe First Award three years after his first featured appearance at African Writers' Evening in 2006. Recently, the event's founder Nii Ayikwei Parkes was himself shortlisted for the Commonwealth Prize and the November 2009 featured reader, Nadifa Mohamed won the 2010 Betty Trask Award.

African Writers' Evening is held bi-monthly from March to November with occasional special events, such as the AWE Heritage Series launched at the Southbank Centre on 6 July 2009 and AWE/NYC, which was held at the Bowery Club in September 2009. While the event is still held mainly at the Poetry Café in Covent Garden, a recent partnership with the Southbank Centre has seen the end-of-year reading in November held at the Royal Festival Hall since 2008.

Policy
African Writers' Evening features writers of all genres and defines "African" based on lived experience rather than simplistic notions of heritage. Featured writers have included white writers like Robyn Scott, Isobel Dixon and Gillian Slovo, as well as Africans of Indian origin such as Sharmila Chauhan.

First event
The first African Writers' Evening was held in July 2003 at the Poetry Café and featured Nii Ayikwei Parkes (who was writer-in-residence at the venue), Jessica Horn, a Ugandan poet, and Abby Ajayi, a Nigerian-British short story and script writer. The event in its current format started in July 2004. Its tagline is: Where Africa speaks and the world listens.

History and expansion
African Writers' Evening initially paid writers travel expenses and they read for free as a way of supporting the reading series. However, in September 2005, the series received funding from the Arts Council of England and began to pay the featured writers an appearance fee. This development allowed the series to begin flying writers in from abroad to share their work: Helon Habila's appearance at the Royal Festival Hall in 2009 was part of this trend.

Since the New York event held in September 2009, African Writers' Evening appears to be on a path of expansion and collaboration. In April 2010, they held an event in Birmingham in collaboration with The Drum Theatre, the British Council and London Book Festival and in July 2010 a book sale event, named the African Book Market was held at the Poetry Café in partnership with major publishers, such as Random House, as well as smaller outfits like Serpent's Tail. They also announced a book discussion initiative starting in September 2010.

Organisation
The event is run by a London-based collective called London Society, Literature, Arts and Music Central, abbreviated as London SLAM Central.

List of previous featured readers

References

External links
 African Writers' Evening

Social events
Events in London
African literature
2003 establishments in the United Kingdom
Recurring events established in 2003